Alfredo 'Fred' Panopio (February 2, 1939 – April 22, 2010) was a Filipino singer and actor who rose to fame in the 1960s and 1970s.

He is known for having made the yodeling style of music famous in the Philippines. This particular kind of music is evident is many of his hits, such as "Pitong Gatang," "Markado," and "Tatlong Baraha". He was also an occasional actor, and appeared in several movies alongside Jess Lapid and Fernando Poe, Jr. He is also known sing the Poe's movie's theme songs. In 1999, Panopio and Victor Wood released an album and became part of the OPM legends.

He appeared in an episode of noon-time variety show Wowowee in 2009 as a special guest, during which host Willie Revillame addressed him as a "Living Legend".

Personal life
He was married to Lolita Mina-Panopio; they had a daughter, Jennifer Panopio.

Death
Panopio died of cardiac arrest on April 22, 2010 at the age of 71 years old in Quezon City, Philippines.

Discography

Albums

Studio albums
Nalulumbay Ako (Dyna Records)
Mga Hinaing Ng Puso (Dyna Records)
Mga Awit ng Pag-ibig ni Fred Panopio (Dyna Records)
Pagpatak Ng Ulan (Dyna Records)
Naku, Inday (Bakit Mo Ibinigay) (Dyna Records) 
Sa Hardin ng Mga Rosas (Dyna Records) 
Awit (Dyna Records) 
Fred Panopio (Self-titled) (Dyna Records)
Sawing-Palad Ako (Dyna Records)
Pamasko Ni Fred Panopio (LP & CD Re-issue) (Dyna Records)
Mahalin Mo Ako (Dyna Records)
Mahal Pa Rin Kita (1975, Plaka Pilipino) 
Sa Lapyahan (1975, Plaka Pilipino) 
Fred Panopio (1977, Plaka Pilipino) 
Bida (1978, Plaka Pilipino)
Banderang Puti (1994)
Fred Panopio (Novelty Collection) Re-issue on CD (Dyna Records)

Compilation albums
Kawawang Cowboy
Pitong Gatang

Singles

Scale Records
"Pitong Gatang" / "Chime Bells" (with Tony Maiquez and His Combo, 1959)

Dyna Records
"Ayos Na ang Buto-buto" (with Pablo Vergara and the Concaver) / "Hello, Miss Wow-Wow" 
"Bakit Ako Nabubuhay" / "Lalu Kitang Iibigin" 
"Unawain Mo Sana" / "Sa Pangarap Na Lamang" 
"Nalulumbay Ako" / "Bakit Ka Nagtatampo" 
"This Is My Song" 
"Higit sa Buhay Ko" / "Maging Sino Ka Man" 
"Puso Ko'y Naghihintay" 
"Ha Ha Ha - Hi Hi Hi" / "Nais Kong Malaman Mo" 
"Siya ang Tanga Kong Mahal" 
"Upang Mahalin Ka" / "Walang Nagmamahal" 
"Hahanap-Hanapin Ko" (adapted from "Sealed with a Kiss") / "Naala-ala Mo Ba Ako" 
"Bayaan Mong Mahalin Kita" / "Kung Sakali Man" 
"Bakas ng Pag-ibig" (Side B) 
"Luluha Ka Rin" 
"Honeymoon sa Buwan" (Side B) 
"Kung Ako'y Mahal Mo" 
"Sawing Palad Ako" / "Naniniwala Ako" (adapted from "I Believe") 
"Ang Kapalaran Ko" (adapted from "My Way") / "Kabilanin sa Pag-ibig" 
"Ako'y sa Iyo Lamang" 
"Naku, Inday! (Bakit Mo Ibinigay)" 
"Kasaysayan ng Pag-ibig" (adapted from "Theme from Love Story") / "Dapat Mong Mabatid" 
"Naglahong Pag-ibig" (Side B) 
"Aking Señorita" (Side B) 
"Kung Kailangan Mo Pa Ako" 
"Belle" (adapted from "Ben") 
"Magtaksil Ka Man" (Side B) 
"Lady" 
"Lumang Larawan" (adapted from "Photograph") 
"Pagsintang 'Sing Laki ng Daigdig" (Side B, adapted from "Top of the World")

Plaka Pilipino
"Mahal Pa Rin Kita" / "Bakit Ako'y Pinaasa" 
"Nasa sa 'Yo 'Yan" (Side B) 
"Putlon Mo Ba?" / "Dili Ko Buot (Nga Mahilak Ka)" 
"Tayo'y Mag-'Bump'" 
"'Type' ni Kumpare, 'Sexy'" / "Gumikan sa Awit" (adapted from "One Day in Your Life") 
"Mahirap Na'ng Ma-Por Nada" / "Lagi Kang Mamahalin" 
"Sa Aking Buhay" / "Bakit Ganyan ang Pagsinta" 
"Banyaga" / "Pahiyom Na, Ngisi Pa" 
"Babay, Baby Babay" / "Minsan" (with Elvira de la Peña) 
"Nasasabik sa Iyo" / "Kawawang Cowboy" (adapted from "Rhinestone Cowboy") (1977) 
"Ingkong" / "Lagi Kang Alaala" 
"Bida" / "Huwag Ka Ng Humirit" 
"Kung Ayaw Mo sa Akin" / "Oh! Ang Mga Babae" 
"Sayang" / "Joe Quintero" (1978) 
"Super Hopia Disco" (with Yoyoy Villame and Max Surban, 1978)

Blackgold Records
"Buto't Balat"
"Daldalan" (Side B, adapted from "Kan-on Pa" by Yoyoy Villame)
"Buwisit" (Side B)
"Hold Up"

Able Music
"Ang Mahal Ko'y Tanging Ikaw" (adapted from "One Moment in Time")

Alpha Records
"Bahay Kubo" / "Gloria, Gloria Labandera" (adapted from "Battle Hymn of the Republic") 
"Muling Magmahalan" / "Pitong Gatang"

Mabuhay Records
"Tatlong Beses Maghapon"

Charm Records
"Upang Mabatid"

Coronet Records
"Turo Turo Restaurant"

Songs

"Ako'y Sundalo"
"Anak ni Markado"
"Alanganing Sumama"
"Aking Señorita" (Teenage Señorita)
"Aling Tina"
"Ako'y Sayo Lamang"
"Ang Aking Pagsuyo"
"Ang Asawa Kong Ambisyosa" (Tie A Yellow Ribbon...)
"Ang Ganda ng Ating Mundo"
"Ay, Ay, Ay Delilah" (Delilah)
"Ang Kalayaan Mo'y Maaangkin" (Love Me for What I Am)
"Ang Labo Mo"
"Ang Singsing Kong Alay"
"Awit" (Killing Me Softly With His Song)
"Ayaw Ko Nang Lumuha Pa"
"Ay'g Dotdot Jane" (Dick and Jane) (with Elvira Dela Pena)
"Babay Baby Babay" (Save Your Kisses For Me)
"Belle" (Ben)
"Bakit Ba, Bakit Ba"
"Bakit Ganyan Ang Pagsinta"
"Bakit Ka Ganyan"
"Bakit, Saan, Kailan"
"Banderang Puti"
"Banyaga" (Cebuano Visayan)
"Bida"
"Bilib Ka Ba?" (My Melody Of Love)
"Bisyo"
"Bohemyo" (Bohemian Rhapsody)
"Bomba, Bomba" (Mama Mama)
"Buhay" (Sunshine)
"Chime Bells"
"Dapat Mong Mabatid" (For All We Know)
"Di Bulhog, Di Buta Ang Gugma" (Swerte Ka) 
"Di Kita Malilimutan"
"Di Kita Maaring Limutin"
"Dili Ko Buot (Nga Mohilak Ka)"
"Duwag" (Coward Of The County)
"Esnatser ng Puso"
"Fred at Elvie"
"Ginang Goli"
"Giyera Noon" (Charade)
"Gloria, Gloria Labandera"
"Gugma Ko, Pinangga Ko Ikaw (Dearest One)"
"Gumikan Sa Awit" (One Day in Your Life)
"Ha, Ha, Ha, Hi, Hi, Hi" (My Stupid Darling)
"Habang Ako'y Kailangan Mo"
"Halik, Halik, Halik (Kiss Me, Kiss Me)"
"Hanggang Wakas (Beyond the Reef)"
"Harana"
"Himig ng Pag-ibig Natin"
"Hinahanap-Hanap Kita"
"Hinum-dumi" (Cebuano Visayan)
"Honeymoon Sa Buwan"
"Huwag Ka Ng Humirit"
"Huwag Mo Akong Pasakitan" (Release Me)
"I Can't Stop Loving You"
"Ikaw ang Aginaldo"
"I Love my teacher (Oh my God!)"
"Ibig Ko Ay Bata"
"Inay, Mahal Kita"
"Inay, Wala Kang Kapantay"
"Ingkong"
"Kailangan Kita Sa Buhay Ko"
"Kantahan Tayo"
"Kay Lupit Mo"
"Kay Saya ng Pasko" (Jingle Bell Rock)
"Kasaysayan ng Pag-ibig"
"Kawawang Cowboy (Rhinestone Cowboy)"
"Kay Gulo"
"Kung Ako'y Iibigin"
"Kung Ikaw Ay Wala Na"
"Kung Lalayo" (But If You Leave Me)
"Kung Mahal Mo Ako"
"Kung Malaya Lang Ako"
"Labingdalawang Araw ng Pasko" (12 Days of Christmas)
"Lady, Aking Lady"
"Lagi Kang Ala-ala"
"Laging "Knock Down"" (Knock Three Times)
"Laging Nasa Isip"
"Luluha Ka Rin"
"Lumang Larawan" (Photograph)
"Magpahilayo" (Cebuano Visayan)
"Mahal Pa Rin Kita"
"Mani"
"Mapungay Na Mata"
"Markado"
"Masiphayo"
"Masulob-on Kong Pasko" (Cebuano Visayan) (with the Filipinas Singers)
Mekeni's Gold"
"Mga Ala-ala"
"Mga Hinaing ng Puso"
"Mo"
"Minsan" (with Elvira Dela Pena)
"Muling Magmahalan"
"Naku! Buhay"
"Naku! Inday Bakit Mo Ibinigay"
"Nalulumbay Ako" (I Feel Blue)
"Nasasabik Sa Iyo"
"Nawa'y Patnubayan Ka"
"Ngano Kaha"
"Ngunit Ngayon"
"O Giliw Ko"
"O Hindi"
"O! Ang Mga Babae" (Zodiac)
"Oh! Candida" (Candida)
"Okey Ngarud" (Sweet Caroline)
"Oye Ho 'Maba" (Oye Como Va)
"Paalam"
"Pagpatak ng Ulan" (Rain)
"Pagkasayang" (Mandayan Song)
"Pagsisisi"
"Pahiyum Na, Ngisi Pa" (Cebuano Visayan)
"Pangako Ako Sa Iyo"
"Pitong Gatang"
"Puso"
"Pusong Wasak"
"Putlon Mo Ba?" (Cebuano Visayan)
"Queta Pu Quecami" (Kapampangan)
"Regalo Ni Itay"
"Rose Of San Anton"
"Sa Hardin Ng Mga Rosas"
"Sa Iyo Ang Aking Puso" (Bridge Over Troubled Water)
"Sa Lapyahan"
"Sabi Nila"
"Sonata ng Pag-ibig"
"Sa Sayawan Natalisod"
"Sabik Sa Pagmamahal"
"Sana'y Pansinin"
"Si Kumpare at Si Kumare"
"Siya ang Tangi kong Mahal"
"Sorry! Mang Fred" (Don't Cry Joni) (with Elvira Dela Pena)
"Sumpang Walang Hanggan"
"Taknang Mahimaya-on" (Cebuano Visayan) (with the Filipinas Singers)
"Tumulo Na Nasasabik sa Iyo"
"Tatlong Baraha"
"Tayo'y Magpakasal Sa Lahat ng Simbahan" (Tie a Yellow Ribbon Round the Ole Oak Tree)
"Turo Turo Restaurant"
"Tayo'y Mag-"Bump" (The Bump)"
"Tayo'y Magmahalan"
"Tumawa Tayo at Humahalakhak"
"Turistang Bilmoko" (An American Dream)
"Turuan Mo Ako"
"Unawain Mo Sana"
"West Virginia"
"Ya Ya Ya Ya"
"Yahu, Yahu"

Filmography
Tisoy 1960
Markado (1960)
Teen-age Crush (1960)
Tres Mosqueteros (1960)
Tatlong Baraha (1961)
Hugo, the Sidewalk Vendor (1962)
Capitan Pepe (1969)
Songs and Lovers (1970)
Omar Cassidy and the Sandalyas Kid (1970)
My Pledge of Love (1970)
From the Bottom of My Heart (1970)
Sweet Caroline (1971)
Gangsters Daw Kami! (1971) .... Legs Diamond
Baldo Is Coming (1971) .... Billy Dikit
Pagputi ng Uwak, Pag-itim ng Tagak (1978)
D'Godson (1983)
Ompong Galapong: May Ulo, Walang Tapon (1988)
Dito sa Pitong Gatang (1992)
Manila Boy (1993)

References

External links

1939 births
2010 deaths
Burials at the Manila Memorial Park – Sucat
Filipino male film actors
20th-century Filipino male singers
Male actors from Nueva Ecija
Manila sound musicians
People from Manila
Singers from Nueva Ecija
Filipino male comedians